This is list of the nominees that the Popular Democratic Party has ticketed for the post of governor of Puerto Rico throughout history.
 style="margin: 0 auto"
! scope=col style="text-align: left" | #
! scope=col style="text-align: left" | Portrait
! scope=col style="text-align: left" | Name
! scope=col style="text-align: left" | Election
! scope=col style="text-align: left" | Result
! scope=col style="text-align: left" | Remarks
|-
! scope=row |  1
|

| Luis Muñoz Marín
| 1948
| won
|
 first democratically elected governor
 first governor under the Constitution of Puerto Rico
|-
! scope=row |  2
|

| Luis Muñoz Marín
| 1952
| won
|
|-
! scope=row |  3
|

| Luis Muñoz Marín
| 1956
| won
|
|-
! scope=row |  4
|

| Luis Muñoz Marín
| 1960
| won
|
|-
! scope=row |  5
| 
| Roberto Sánchez Vilella
| 1964
| won
|
 1st Secretary of State of Puerto Rico
|-
! scope=row |  6
|
| Luis Negrón López
| 1968
| lost
|
 9th President pro tempore of the Senate of Puerto Rico
|-
! scope=row |  7
| 
| Rafael Hernández Colón
| 1972
| won
|
 6th President of the Senate of Puerto Rico
|-
! scope=row |  8
| 
| Rafael Hernández Colón
| 1976
| lost
|
|-
! scope=row |  9
| 
| Rafael Hernández Colón
| 1980
| lost
|
|-
! scope=row |  10
| 
| Rafael Hernández Colón
| 1984
| won
|
|-
! scope=row |  11
| 
| Rafael Hernández Colón
| 1988
| won
|
|-
! scope=row |  12
|
| Victoria Muñoz Mendoza
| 1992
| lost
|
 daughter of Luis Muñoz Marín
 first woman to seek the post of governor of Puerto Rico
 member of the 18th Senate of Puerto Rico
 member of the 19th Senate of Puerto Rico
|-
! scope=row |  13
| 
| Héctor Luis Acevedo
| 1996
| lost
|
 10th Secretary of State of Puerto Rico
 former mayor of San Juan
|-
! scope=row |  14
| 
| Sila María Calderón
| 2000
| won
|
 first and only woman ever to be elected as Governor of Puerto Rico
 former mayor of San Juan
 12th Secretary of State of Puerto Rico
|-
! scope=row |  15
| 
| Aníbal Acevedo Vilá
| 2004
| won
|
 member of the 24th House of Representatives of Puerto Rico
 Minority Leader of the 25th House of Representatives of Puerto Rico
 17th Resident Commissioner of Puerto Rico
|-
! scope=row |  16
| 
| Aníbal Acevedo Vilá
| 2008
| lost
|
|-
! scope=row |  17
| 
| Alejandro Garcia Padilla
| 2012
| won
|
|-
! scope=row |  18
| 
| David Bernier
| 2016
| lost
|
 23rd Secretary of State of Puerto Rico
 former President of the Puerto Rico Olympic Committee
|-
! scope=row |  19
|

| Carlos Delgado Altieri
| 2020
| lost
|
 former mayor of Isabela, Puerto Rico
|-

References

Popular Democratic Party (Puerto Rico)
Lists of Puerto Rican politicians